Sister Hazel is an American alternative rock band from Gainesville, Florida, whose style blends elements of jangle pop, folk rock, classic rock, and southern rock.

History
Sister Hazel formed in Gainesville, Florida, in 1993 and was named for Sister Hazel Williams, a local missionary who ran a homeless shelter. The group released its self-titled debut album in 1994, through its independent record label Croakin' Poets. Shortly after its release, singer/guitarist Ryan Newell and drummer Mark Trojanowski joined the band. Newell played on the album before officially joining the group.

The band's second album, ...Somewhere More Familiar was released in 1997 and sold approximately 30,000 copies through its initial pressing, prompting Universal Records to sign the band. Universal re-released ...Somewhere More Familiar in late 1997. A single from the album, "All For You" hit No. 11 on the Billboard Hot 100 and remains the band's most successful single.

The band's third album Fortress was released in 2000 by Universal. The band worked with producers Mike Clink (Guns N' Roses, Mötley Crüe, Heart), Richie Zito (Cheap Trick), and Paul Ebersold (3 Doors Down). The album featured minor pop hits "Champagne High" and "Change Your Mind."  The album's title track was featured as the outro of Valparaiso University radio station WVUR's weekly Saturday night program during the 2000-01 academic year.

In 2003, after the band split from Universal, they released their fourth studio album, Chasing Daylight, on the Sixthman label and toured throughout the year to promote the album. The band's internet presence emerged during this time period, and hardcore fans dubbing themselves "Hazelnuts" studied setlists, shared bootleg concert recordings, and initiated a promotion scheme with the band through their official website. 2003 also saw the simultaneous release of Live*LIVE, a two-disc live album, and A Life in the Day, a live DVD.

In 2004, Sister Hazel released their next studio album Lift. Songs from Lift were re-recorded for 2005's Lift: Acoustic Renditions, an EP of studio acoustic takes on five of the songs, offered exclusively through Apple's iTunes Store. In July 2005, the Sister Hazel album was re-issued again by Sixthman, in response to claims that the album had become difficult to find in stores.

Sister Hazel then promoted their album, Absolutely, which was released on October 10, 2006. The band also continued to tour and hold annual fan gathering events, The Rock Boat and The Rock Slope. Absolutely is the band's highest-charting album on the Billboard charts following Fortress and it received 4 out of a possible 5 stars from Allmusic, a tie with Fortresss score.

On June 5, 2007, Sister Hazel released a "hybrid" album entitled BAM! Volume 1. It contains B-sides from the Absolutely recording sessions and some from previous albums.

Sister Hazel also released a holiday album called Santa's Playlist on September 25, 2007.

On February 9, 2008, Sister Hazel performed a live concert at Daytona International Speedway for the Budweiser Shootout.

Sister Hazel released a live acoustic album on June 17, 2008, entitled Before the Amplifiers, Live Acoustic on Croakin' Poets/Rock Ridge Music.  The record features sixteen tracks, including the band's hits, fan favorites, and live concert staples, all in a stripped-down, acoustic format.  The album was recorded on January 12 at Nickel & Dime Studios in Atlanta (other bands who have recorded there in the past include Indigo Girls, The B-52's, Shawn Mullins) in front of 100 lucky fans who were chosen at random from more than five thousand entries.

At the July 18, 2008, concert at Wolf Trap Farm Park, drummer Mark Trojanowski took paternity leave for his newborn child. Former Vertical Horizon and current Doobie Brothers drummer Ed Toth played in his place.

On July 9, 2009 Ford Motor Company announced a collaboration with Sister Hazel to promote the company's new Sync Technology, which is available on a number of Ford, Lincoln, and Mercury vehicles.  The band has been chosen to be the face of the company's "Sync My Ride" website, www.syncmyride.com.

The band released their seventh studio album of original songs (tenth album overall) on August 18, 2009.  The album, entitled Release, contains 12 tracks and is on the Rock Ridge Music label.  On the day of release, Release was the number one album on iTunes.

The band entered the studio less than six months after releasing Release and began work on their new album, Heartland Highway. The album was released on October 12, 2010, and featured "Stay a While" as the first radio single.

The band's ninth studio album, Lighter in the Dark, was announced in the later part of 2015. It is their first country album, and was released on February 19, 2016. The lead single from the album is "We Got It All Tonight". Two songs, "We Got It All Tonight" and "Karaoke Song", which features country artist Darius Rucker, were made available for instant download for those who pre-ordered the album.

Dr. Hazel Kirkland Williams, the band's namesake, died on July 16, 2016, at the age of 91 in Gainesville.

The band released an EP entitled Water on February 9, 2018, which featured the lead single "Roll On Bye".

It was announced, less than a week after the release of Water, that the band have begun recording their next EP (a follow-up to Water) in Nashville.  The next EP Wind was released on September 7, 2018.  The next EP in the "Elements" series, Fire, was released on February 8, 2019. The final installment in the "Elements" series, Earth, was released on September 6, 2019. Each of the EPs in the series included a portion of a song at the end, intended to be linked together in a future release. On November 26, 2019, all the EPs were combined into a single release, Elements. The 25-song, double-disc set includes the final "Elements" song pieced together.

Use in media
The band has had music featured in several movies and soundtracks including Major League: Back to the Minors, The Wedding Planner, Clay Pigeons, Bedazzled and 10 Things I Hate About You.  Sister Hazel also appear on the Fleetwood Mac tribute album, Legacy:  A Tribute to Fleetwood Mac's Rumours with their cover version of "Gold Dust Woman".  In 1999, they recorded a cover of "September Gurls" for the Big Star tribute album, Big Star, Small World.  However, the track was not included when the album was released in 2006. The song "Where Do You Go" was featured on Scrubs (Season 6, Episode 4, "My House").

 Musical style 
 Influences 
While some of the band members feel like their sounds are simply Sister Hazel, Ryan Newell has cited Jimi Hendrix, Stevie Ray Vaughan, Jimmy Page, Van Halen, and Eric Clapton as his influences.  The band has certainly been influenced by other southern rock and folk music.

Philanthropy
Lyrics for Life is a non-profit organization for the benefit of pediatric cancer. Sister Hazel had a benefit concert to support the Sarah Jones Scholarship Fund.

Band members
Ken Block – lead vocals, acoustic guitar (1993–present)
Jett Beres – bass, harmony vocals (1993–present)
Andrew Copeland – rhythm guitar, vocals, keyboards (1993–present)
Ryan Newell – lead and slide guitar, harmony vocals (1993–present)
Mark Trojanowski – drums (1993–present)Touring musicians'''
Dave LaGrande – keyboards, saxophone (2012–present)

Discography
Studio albums

 EPs 

Other releases99.3 The Zone – Collector's Edition 1997 – 1997
"Let Your Love Flow" – Clay Pigeons Soundtrack – 1998Live*LIVE – Live Double Album – March 2003A Life in the Day – Live DVD – March 2003Chasing Daylight – Acoustic EP – August 2004 (downloadable exclusive)Lift: Acoustic Renditions – April 2005 (downloadable exclusive)BAM! Volume 1 – June 5, 2007 (B-Sides Album)Santa's Playlist – September 25, 2007 (Holiday Album)Before the Amplifiers, Live Acoustic – Live Album – June 17, 200820 In '10 Collection – Compilation Album – February 8, 2010 (Amazon.com downloadable exclusive)Threeve – EP – June 1, 2010 (iTunes downloadable exclusive)11411 – Compilation/Sampler – January 3, 2011 (Amazon.com downloadable exclusive)This Is Gator Country – 2011 (featured on a special compilation CD titled "You're in Gator Country," sold exclusively by the University of Florida Athletic Association)20 Stages – Live Double Album [CD or Limited Edition Vinyl LP] – October 7, 201420 Stages – Live DVD – October 7, 2014Live From Daryl's House Club – Live CD – December 9, 2016Live From Daryl's House Club – Live DVD – December 9, 2016Before the Amplifiers 2'' – Live Album – December 10, 2021

Singles

References

External links 
 
 Video Interview with Ken Block of Sister Hazel on Swigged!

Musical groups from Gainesville, Florida
Jangle pop groups
Musical groups established in 1993
Rock Ridge Music artists
1993 establishments in Florida
20th-century American guitarists
Alternative rock groups from Florida
Southern rock musical groups from Florida
Folk rock groups